In American comic books published by Marvel Comics, a mutant is a human being that possesses a genetic trait called the X-gene. It causes the mutant to  develop superhuman powers that manifest at puberty. Human mutants are sometimes referred to as a human subspecies Homo sapiens superior, or simply Homo superior. Mutants are the evolutionary progeny of Homo sapiens, and are generally assumed to be the next stage in human evolution.  The accuracy of this is the subject of much debate in the Marvel Universe.

Unlike Marvel's mutates, which are characters who develop their powers only after exposure to outside stimuli or energies (such as the Hulk, Spider-Man, the Fantastic Four, Absorbing Man and Captain Marvel), mutants have actual genetic mutations.

Publication History

Early Antecedents
A March 1952 story in Amazing Detective Cases #11 called "The Weird Woman" tells of a woman describing herself as a mutant who seeks a similarly superhuman mate. Roger Carstairs, a mutant who can create illusions, is shown in Man Comics #28, dated September 1953. A character with superhuman powers, born from a radiation-exposed parent, was seen in "The Man with the Atomic Brain!" in Journey into Mystery #52 in May 1959; although not specifically called a "mutant", his origin is consistent with one. A little-known story in Tales of Suspense #6 (November 1959) titled "The Mutants and Me!" was one of the first Marvel (then known as Atlas) stories to feature a named "mutant". Tad Carter, a mutant with telekinetic powers, is shown in Amazing Adult Fantasy #14, dated July 1962.

Officially, Namor the Sub-Mariner is considered the first mutant superhero whom Marvel Comics ever published, debuting in 1939. However, Namor was not actually described as a mutant until Fantastic Four Annual #1, decades after his first appearance. The same is true of Toro, partner of the android Human Torch introduced in 1940.

Modern Concept and Development
The modern concept of mutants as a distinct species independent of homo sapiens began development under Marvel writer and editor-in-chief Stan Lee in the early 1960s, as a means to create a large number of superheroes and supervillains without having to think of a separate origin for each one. As part of the concept, Lee decided that these mutant teenagers should, like ordinary ones, attend school in order to better cope with the world, in this case Xavier's School for Gifted Youngsters. Following the 1963 debut of this conception of mutants in the superhero series X-Men, Marvel later introduced several additional mutant superhero teams, including The New Mutants, X-Factor, Excalibur, X-Force, and Generation X.

In early X-Men stories, Professor Xavier and others suggest that mutation is related to nuclear radiation, as his parents worked on the development of the atomic bomb, though later descriptions of mutation would describe it deriving from genetics. The first in-story mention of mutants in this context is in The X-Men #1, in which Professor Xavier explains his school to the newly-admitted Jean Grey: "You, Miss Grey, like the other students at this most exclusive school, are a mutant! You possess an extra power...one which ordinary humans do not!! That is why I call my students...X-Men, for Ex-tra power!" This issue also features the first reference to mutants as the species "Homo Superior" by Magneto. Following the relaunch under writer Chris Claremont, narration in stories taking place on Muir Island described Moira MacTaggert as "second only to Charles Xavier as an authority on genetic mutation." In the New Mutants graphic novel, after witnessing Rahne Sinclair demonstrate her mutant shapeshifting ability, MacTaggert refers to "an anomalous DNA matrix" in her blood signaling that Sinclair "could be a mutant."  The cause of mutation was elaborated upon in the first issue of the spin-off series X-Factor, in which Cameron Hodge refers to "people who possess the X-Factor mutation in their genetic makeup." This genetic mutation was later dubbed the X-Gene. At one point, Beast states that the X-Gene is located on the 23rd chromosome; the process described is that the gene activates mutation producing a protein stimulating chemical signals which induce mutations on other genes.

Mutations are depicted as generally manifesting during adolescence, however this is not universal. Some mutants, such as Nightcrawler, are visibly mutated from birth, while others like Magneto do not develop their abilities until adulthood. Some mutants are not even aware of their latent mutations unless deliberately activated, such as Polaris, whose manifestation was triggered with technological aid.

Later developments 

In the 2022 storyline, A.X.E.: Judgment Day, mutants are discovered by Eternals to be an offshoot of the Deviant race, triggering efforts by the Eternals' leader Druig to wipe them out, giving the mutants and explicit link to the Celestials and to the publisher's cosmic storylines. In the series' conclusion, new Prime Eternal Zuras confirms the end of hostilities with the mutants and proposed a formal treaty alliance, explaining to Storm, "You mutants share some DNA with Deviants? It's of little matter. Until a mutant triggers our physiological 'excess deviation' response, you're not Deviants in the way that counts. You're just human."

Mutant Subtypes

Omega-level mutants

An Omega-level mutant is one with the most powerful genetic potential of their mutant abilities. The term was first seen in the 1986 issue Uncanny X-Men #208 as "Class Omega", but was completely unexplained beyond the obvious implication of it referring to an exceptional level of power. The term was not seen again until the 2001 limited series X-Men Forever. For a time, no firm definition was offered in the comics, leading to several conflicting opinions and debates as to who or what qualified as Omega-level. In July 2019, Marvel provided an official definition in the X-Men relaunch starting in House of X by Jonathan Hickman [emphasis in original]:

From X of Swords event, many new Omega-level mutants were introduced from the island of Arakko. The Great Ring of Arakko (equivalent of the Quiet Council of Krakoa), is composed mostly of Omega-level mutants.

Franklin Richards was recently considered Omega-level, however it has since been revealed that he is not actually a mutant, instead he unconsciously altered his DNA when he was a child to make it appear that he had the X-Gene to make himself special. Due to this revelation, he is no longer welcome on Krakoa.

 Elixir (Josh Foley)
 Exodus (Bennet du Paris)
 Genesis
 Hope Summers
 High Mutant Prophet Idyll
 Iceman (Bobby Drake)
 Isca the Unbeaten
 Idyll the Future Seer
 Kid Omega (Quentin Quire)
 Lactuca the Knower
 Legion (David Haller)
 Lodus Logos
 Magneto (Erik Lehnsherr)
 Marvel Girl (Jean Grey)
 Mister M (Absolon Mercator)
 Monarch (Jamie Braddock)
 Nameless, the Shape-Shifter Queen
 Ora Serrata the Witness
 Proteus (Kevin MacTaggert)
 Redroot the Forest
 Sobunar of the Depths
 Storm (Ororo Monroe)
 Tarn the Uncaring
 Uqesh the Bridge
 Vulcan (Gabriel Summers)
 Xilo the First Defender

Changelings
Introduced in the second series of X-Factor, a changeling is a mutant whose powers manifest at birth. Jamie Madrox and Damian Tryp are examples of this sub-class.

Cheyarafim and Neyaphem
Cheyarafim and Neyaphem first appear in Uncanny X-Men #429. According to the character Azazel, the Cheyarafim are a group of angel-like mutants who were the traditional enemies of the Neyaphem, a demonic-looking group of mutants who lived in Biblical times. The Cheyarafim were fanatics who had a strict, absolutist view of morality which led them into conflict with the Neyaphem. This escalated into a holy war, causing the Neyaphem to be exiled into an alternate dimension. What happened to the Cheyarafim after this has not been revealed.

Angel and Icarcus are said to be descended from Cheyarafim, while Nightcrawler is supposedly the son of a Neyaphem, Azazel.

Chimeras
In the pages of "House of X and Powers of X," the Chimeras are genetically-altered humanoid mutants who are combined from the DNA of past mutants so that they would have combinations of their power set and also propagate the mutant population. Third generation Chimeras have a 10% failure rate making them unable to be warriors. Fourth generation Chimeras have a corrupted hive mind. They were more common in Moira MacTaggert's ninth life where they were created in Mister Sinister's Breeding Pits on Mars.

Sometime after the "X of Swords" storyline, Mister Sinister created his first Chimera by splicing his own DNA samples with the DNA samples of an Arraki named Tarn the Uncaring. When the experiment proved to be a failure and the Quiet Council of Krakoa found out about it, Mister Sinister is undeterred in his next plans to research the Chimeras.

During the "Sins of Sinister" storyline, Mister Sinister was in an alternate timeline where he caused all the Krakoans to become Sinisters like him. This enabled Mister Sinister to create his first generation Chimeras.

Known Chimeras include:

 Cardinal - Created from the genetic templates of Francis Fanny, Nightcrawler, and Rachel Summers.
 North - Created from the genetic templates of Emma Frost and Polaris.
 Rasputin IV - Created from the genetic templates of Colossus, Kitty Pryde, Quentin Quire, Unus the Untouchable, and X-23.
 A bunch of unnamed Chimeras created from the genetic templates of Eye-Boy and Cyclops, a bunch of Wolverine Chimeras, and a bunch of Chimeras created from the genetic templates of Proteus and Wolverine were used by Mister Sinister to fight the X-Men when they raid his old Alaskan lair.
 The first generation Chimeras seen emerging from the Sinister Factory consist of a Beast/Colossus Chimera, a Cyclops/Wolverine Chimera, and a Kitty Pryde/Angel Chimera. He also used some Cyclops/Ora Serrata Chimeras in his attack on Arrako.
 The Legion of the Night are Chimeras that were made from the genetic templates of Nightcrawler spliced with other genetic templates. They consist of:
 Wagnerine - She was made from the genetic templates of X-23 and Nightcrawler.
 Auntie Fortune - She was made from the genetic templates of Domino and Nightcrawler.
 Wallcrawler - He was made from the genetic templates of Nightcrawler and Spider-Man.
 An unnamed Colossus/Nightcrawler Chimera.
 An unnamed Pixie/Nightcrawler Chimera.
 An unnamed Emplate/Nightcrawler Chimera.
 An unnamed Pyro/Nightcrawler Chimera.
 An unnamed Sabretooth/Nightcrawler Chimera.
 An unnamed Toad/Nightcrawler Chimera.
 An incarnation of the Nasty Boys are Chimeras that were made from the genetic template of Cyclops spliced with other genetic templates. They consist of:
 An unnamed Multiple Man/Cyclops Chimera with three heads.
 An unnamed Hairbag/Cyclops Chimera.
 An unnamed Ramrod/Cyclops Chimera.
 An unnamed Gorgeous George/Cyclops Chimera who has many eyes, no mouth, and a body of wood.
 An unnamed Slab/Cyclops Chimera.
 An unnamed Ruckus/Cyclops Chimera.

Dominant Species/lupine
Maximus Lobo claims to be a part of a mutant sub-species of feral wolf-like mutants, whom he calls the Dominant Species. He later tries to recruit Wolf Cub into his ranks, to no avail. A few years later, another mutant, Romulus, claims that some human mutants evolved from canines instead of primates. Mutants who are a part of this group include Romulus, Wolverine, Daken, Sabretooth, Wolfsbane, Wild Child, Thornn, Feral, and Wolf Cub, with X-23 and the Native as other likely candidates. These groups appear to be one and the same.

Extraterrestrial mutants
Humans are not the only species to have mutant subspecies.

 Ariel
 Broo
 Cerise
 Longshot
 Ultra Girl
 Warlock

Externals
Created by Rob Liefeld, Externals are immortal mutants whose powers have allowed them to exist for centuries. Eventually, most of the Externals are killed by Selene, and later by Apocalypse.

 Absalom
 Burke
 Candra
 Crule
 Gideon
 Nicodemus
 Saul
 Selene
 Apocalypse

"Homo superior superior"
Introduced in Chris Claremont's X-Treme X-Men, a character known as Vargas claims to be humanity's natural response to mutants.  Vargas was born at the epitome of peak physical skill, having superhuman levels of strength, speed, reflexes, agility, stamina, and durability.  Vargas also seems to be immune to various mutant abilities (such as Rogue's absorption and Psylocke's telekinetic blast).

Hybrids
Mutants have been shown to successfully crossbreed or a result of crossbreed with Humans (Homo sapiens), Atlanteans (Homo mermanus), fairies, and other humanoid aliens like Shi'ar, etc.

 Abigail Brand
 Namor
 Namora
 Namorita
 Lifeguard
 Pixie
 Slipstream
 Xandra Neramani

Mutants as metaphor

As a fictional oppressed minority, mutants are often used as extended metaphors for real-world people and situations. In 1982, X-Men writer Chris Claremont said, "[mutants] are hated, feared and despised collectively by humanity for no other reason than that they are mutants. So what we have here, intended or not, is a book that is about racism, bigotry and prejudice."

Danny Fingeroth writes extensively in his book Superman on the Couch about the appeal of mutants and their meaning to society:

An obvious parallel between homosexuality and mutation is drawn in the feature film X2, where Iceman's mother asks, "Have you tried not being a mutant?"  This question (or various forms thereof) is common among parents who find out their children are gay. In the 2011 film X-Men: First Class, Hank McCoy (later known as Beast), upon being outed to a colleague as a mutant, responds, "You didn't ask, so I didn't tell."

In his article Super Heroes, a Modern Mythology, Richard Reynolds writes:

Other versions

Earth X
Within the Earth X universe, the powers of the vast majority of Marvel's human superheroes were revealed to have been the result of genetic manipulation by the Celestials millions of years in the past.

Ultimate Marvel
In the Ultimate Marvel universe within the pages of the Ultimate Origins #1, it is revealed that super-powered "mutants" were artificially created via genetic modification by the Weapon X program in a laboratory in Alberta, Canada in October 1943. The project was an attempt to produce a supersoldier, inspired by the existence of Captain America. James Howlett was the first individual to be so modified. At some later point, possibly during a confrontation between Magneto and his parents, the mutant trigger was released into the environment worldwide, leading to the appearance of mutants in the general population. Following the events of the Ultimatum storyline, information concerning the origins of mutancy was made public and steps were taken in the US to make being a mutant illegal. While the move apparently has majority support among the non-mutant population, a vocal minority has voiced concern that it will lead to witch-hunts and genocide.

Other media

X-Men film series

Marvel Cinematic Universe 
Following Disney's acquisition of 21st Century Fox in 2019, the film rights to the X-Men and other mutant characters reverted to Marvel Studios. When asked if his use of the term "mutants" meant the film would be avoiding the term "X-Men", Feige clarified that he was using the two terms interchangeably. He added that Marvel Studios' approach to the characters would be different to Fox's franchise. Since 2022, the mutant race have appeared in various media set within the Marvel Cinematic Universe (MCU) media franchise:

Mutants are first implicitly introduced through a variant of Charles Xavier from the alternate universe Earth-838 in the film Doctor Strange in the Multiverse of Madness (2022). 
 The first mutant belonging to the main reality of the MCU is Kamala Khan / Ms. Marvel (unlike the comics where she is an Inhuman), which is stated in the final episode of the television series Ms. Marvel (2022). A musical excerpt of the X-Men: The Animated Series (1992–1997) theme is featured in both Ms. Marvel and Multiverse of Madness. 
 The television series She-Hulk: Attorney at Law (2022) features numerous implicit references and allusions to mutants from throughout Marvel Comics. A website article insinuating James "Logan" Howlett / Wolverine being active in the MCU is an easter egg in the episode "Superhuman Law", where he is indirectly described in an online news article regarding a man who "fights with metal claws" during a bar brawl. Additionally the series features supporting appearances from David Hollis / Mr. Immortal (David Pasquesi) and Alejandro Montoya / El Águila (Joseph Castillo-Midyett), both of whom identify as mutants in the comics. The main-on-end credits of the episode "Mean, Green, and Straight Poured into These Jeans" depicts a visual of Augustus Pugliese (Josh Segarra) displaying his sneaker colllection to his colleague Nikki Ramos (Ginger Gonzaga), with some designs derived from the appearances of Wolverine, Namor, Cyclops, Gambit and Cable. The series' finale "Whose Show Is This?", which depicts protagonist Jennifer Walters (Tatiana Maslany) breaking the fourth wall by travelling to Marvel Studios to have the episode altered, features a conversation between herself and "K.E.V.I.N.", a fictionalized algorithm based on company president and producer Kevin Feige. Walters asks K.E.V.I.N. when the X-Men themselves would debut in the MCU, to which it declines to answer.
 In Black Panther: Wakanda Forever (2022), Namor retains his comics background as a mutant. In the film, his mother ingested a vibranium laced plant while pregnant, giving him abilities that his people who consumed it did not due to his mutation, including pointed ears, winged ankles, the ability to breathe air and water, and extended longevity.
 Deadpool 3 (2024), a sequel to 20th Century Fox's Deadpool 2 (2018), will integrate the X-Men film series' iterations of Wade Wilson / Deadpool and Wolverine into the continuity of the MCU, reprised by Ryan Reynolds and Hugh Jackman respectively.

 In September 2022, Deadline Hollywood Justin Kroll said an X-Men film would not be happening "for a very long time" and, outside of a writer being hired, did not expect any updates regarding casting for "some time".

See also
 List of Marvel Comics characters
 Mutants in fiction
 Metahuman
 Superhuman
 Superpower (ability)

References

Superhero fiction themes
Human-derived fictional species
X-Men